Paradise, Hawaiian Style is a 1966 American musical comedy film starring Elvis Presley. It was the third and final motion picture that Presley filmed in Hawaii. The film reached #40 on the Variety weekly box office chart, earning $2.5 million in theaters. In agreeing to do this film, Elvis's manager, Colonel Tom Parker, was hoping to replicate the success of Presley's 1961 film, Blue Hawaii.

Plot
Rick Richards (Presley) returns to his home in Hawaii after being fired from his job as an airline pilot. He and his buddy Danny Kohana (James Shigeta) go into the helicopter charter business together. But Rick's reckless flying and his careless flirting with local women may cost Rick the business and Danny his home. This tendency seems to get in the way of their secretary, Judy "Friday" Hudson (Suzanna Leigh) and Rick getting together.

Disaster looms as Danny becomes overdue on a flight after Rick has been grounded by government officials. Rick must decide if he should risk losing his license forever by going to look for his friend.

Cast
 Elvis Presley as Rick Richards
 Suzanna Leigh as Judy "Friday" Hudson
 James Shigeta as Danny Kohana
 Jan Shepard as Betty Kohana
 Philip Ahn as Moki Kaimana
 Donna Butterworth as Jan Kohana
 Marianna Hill as Lani Kaimana
 Irene Tsu as Pua
 Linda Wong as Lehua Kawena
 Julie Parrish as Joanna
 Red West as fighter in bar (uncredited)
 Grady Sutton as Mr. Cubberson

Production
Principal photography in Paradise, Hawaiian Style began in Hawaii on July 27, 1965 (with the working title of Hawaiian Paradise) and finished on September 29 in Los Angeles.

Major scenes in both Blue Hawaii (1961) and this film were shot on the island of Kauaʻi, with the Coco Palms Resort prominently featured. The famous resort was destroyed by Hurricane Iniki in 1992 and never rebuilt.

Some scenes were filmed above, at and around the Polynesian Cultural Center on O'ahu.

Around the official wrap on production, Elvis met Tom Jones, who visited the set, and The Beatles, who visited Elvis’ Bel Air home a few weeks after production was completed.

Soundtrack

Reception
Released in June 1966, Paradise, Hawaiian Style, despite its "stunning aerial photography", "inspired a collective yawn" with film critics. The New York Times film reviewer Vincent Canby compared the film to the formulaic 1930s musicals that Bing Crosby used to star in, concluding that it was "all harmless and forgettable." Kevin Thomas of the Los Angeles Times called it "pleasant hot-weather diversion. Pretty much the usual Elvis Presley formula of songs and romance, this Paramount release ... has the added bonus of lush tropical scenery in color. And Elvis, as always, remains [a] relaxed, enjoyable entertainer."

Variety called the film "a gaily-begarbed and flowing musical," with the Hawaii setting seldom before having been "utilized to such lush advantage." The Monthly Film Bulletin wrote, "This is Elvis Presley right back in the old rut, parading his talents as a man of action while women swoon at his passage. The script is rather worse than routine, and the songs and choreography are undistinguished; which leaves very little but Wallace Kelley's colourful photography of the strictly tourist-eye view of the islands."

See also
List of American films of 1966

References

Notes

Citations

Bibliography

 Knight, Timothy. Elvis Presley in the Movies. New York: Metro Books, 2009. .

External links
 
 
 
 
 Elvis in Hawaii 
 Review by Janet Branagan at Apollo Movie Guide
 Review of the movie collection "Lights! Camera! Elvis! Collection (King Creole, Blue Hawaii, G.I. Blues, Fun in Acapulco, Roustabout, Girls! Girls! Girls!, Paradise, Hawaiian Style, Easy Come, Easy Go) by Paul Mavis at DVD Talk, August 6, 2007
 Review by Jon Danziger at digitallyOBSESSED!, March 2, 2003

1966 films
1966 musical comedy films
1966 romantic comedy films
American musical comedy films
American romantic comedy films
American aviation films
American romantic musical films
Films directed by Mickey Moore
Films produced by Hal B. Wallis
Films set in Hawaii
Films shot in Hawaii
Films shot in Los Angeles
Paramount Pictures films
1966 directorial debut films
1960s English-language films
1960s American films